Besim Mehmedić (born 12 September 1955) is a Bosnian politician who was a member of the Party for Bosnia and Herzegovina until 2012. He served as Prime Minister of Sarajevo Canton from 2009 to 2011. Mehmedić was also the director of the Sarajevo Institute for Urbanization from 2002 to 2004 and the Federal Minister of Transport from 2001 until 2005.

Mehmedić was born in Sarajevo, PR Bosnia and Herzegovina, FPR Yugoslavia, where he completed his primary and highschool education, before graduating from the Faculty of Architecture at the University of Sarajevo in 1979. He was also the 26th President of the Assembly of FK Sarajevo from 2000 to 2001, and was the club's Chairman of the Board as well.

References

1955 births
Living people
Politicians from Sarajevo
Bosniaks of Bosnia and Herzegovina
Bosnia and Herzegovina Muslims
Party for Bosnia and Herzegovina politicians
FK Sarajevo presidents of the assembly
University of Sarajevo alumni
Architects from Sarajevo